Jaimee Nobbs (born 10 March 1995) is an Australian former competitive figure skater. She is a three-time (2011, 2013, 2014) Australian ladies' bronze medallist.

Early life 
Jaimee Nobbs was born in South Perth, Western Australia. She is the daughter of Australian field hockey players Michael Nobbs and Lee Capes. Her father played in the 1984 Summer Olympics and her mother won a gold medal in field hockey at the 1988 Summer Olympics. Nobbs' younger sister is also a field hockey player, playing for Australia's women's national field hockey team. Nobbs began skating in 2000.

Career 
Nobbs was coached by Irina Stavrovskaia and Valentin Kadzevitch. She formerly lived and trained in Perth before moving to Sydney.

Competitive highlights 
JGP: Junior Grand Prix

References 

1995 births
Living people
People from Western Australia
Competitors at the 2015 Winter Universiade